Furness Building Society is a British building society, which has its headquarters in Barrow-in-Furness, Cumbria, England. Established in 1865, it is the 17th largest in the United Kingdom based on total assets of £813 million as at 31 December 2010. It is a member of the Building Societies Association.

The Society expanded its call centre in 2009 to deal with investments and insurance queries. The Society has two wholly-owned subsidiary companies: Furness Mortgage Services Ltd and Furness Independent Financial Advisers.  In 2017, Chris Harrison was appointed as the CEO of Furness Building Society.

Locations 
Furness Building Society has 9 branches across North West England including one in Barrow-in-Furness and others in Dalton-in-Furness, Grange-over-Sands, Kendal, Lancaster,  Millom, Poulton-le-Fylde, Preston and Ulverston.

References

External links 
 Furness Building Society
 Building Societies Association
 KPMG Building Societies Database 2008
 Chris Harrison appointed CEO

Building societies of England
Banks established in 1865
Organizations established in 1865
Companies based in Barrow-in-Furness
1865 establishments in England